Osa pulchra is a species of rare flowering plant in the monotypic genus Osa, belonging to the family Rubiaceae. There are only two known populations in Costa Rica, with less than a total of thirty individual plants and a small population in Panama. The genus name is derived from that of the Osa Peninsula in southwestern Costa Rica. The plant is a shrub or small tree and  has been cultivated in several botanical gardens, including Kew Gardens, the New York Botanical Garden, and the Huntington Botanical Garden. 

Osa pulchra has large white, trumpet-shaped, pendulous flowers reminiscent of those of certain Solanaceous genera - particularly those of Brugmansia and Solandra. The flowers are pendent, borne on long pedicels and feature fused petals borne upon slender, elongate corolla tubes. The blooms are highly fragrant at night and are most likely pollinated by bats (chiropterophily).

Cultivation 
This species is highly coveted because of its ornamental value. It needs a warm and humid climate with a well drained substrate and bright, indirect light.
The plant is most easily propagated by seed, since cuttings can only be taken from the top of the plant due to apical dominance.  Seeds will germinate after one month, after which it takes three more weeks for them to emerge fully from the substrate and shed their seed coats.

References

Flora of Costa Rica
Chiococceae